The 1998 Illinois gubernatorial election took place on November 3, 1998. Incumbent Republican Governor Jim Edgar did not run for a third term in office. Republican nominee George Ryan, the Illinois Secretary of State, narrowly won the election against Democratic Congressman Glenn Poshard. 

As of 2022 this was the last Governor election in which St. Clair county did not vote for the winning candidate.

Election information
The primaries and general elections coincided with those for federal elections (Senate and House), as well as those for other state offices. The election was part of the 1998 Illinois elections.

Turnout
For the primaries, turnout for the gubernatorial primaries was 24.58%, with 1,658,296 votes cast and turnout for the lieutenant gubernatorial primaries was 19.76% with 1,333,446 votes cast. For the general election, turnout was 49.72%, with 3,358,705 votes cast.

Democratic primaries

Governor

Candidates
 Larry Burgess
 Jim Burns (1945–2020), former United States Attorney for the Northern District of Illinois (1993–1997)
 Roland Burris (born 1937), former Attorney General of Illinois (1991-1995) and candidate for the Democratic nomination for Governor in 1994.
 Maurice Horton 
 Glenn Poshard (born 1945), U.S. Representative (1989-1999)
 John Schmidt (born 1943), United States Associate Attorney General (1994-1997)

Results

Lieutenant governor

Candidates
Mary Lou Kearns, Kane County Coroner
Pat Quinn, former Treasurer of Illinois

Republican primaries

Governor

Candidates
George Ryan, Secretary of State of Illinois
Chad Koppie, perennial candidate and conservative activist

Results

Lieutenant governor

Candidates
Corinne Wood, member of the Illinois House of Representatives

Results

Reform primary

Governor

Candidates
Lawrence Redmond

Results

Lieutenant governor

Candidates
Phyllis Nirchi

Results

General election

Results

See also
List of governors of Illinois

References

1998
Illinois
Gubernatorial